Chulalu (also Romanized as Chūlalū) is a village in Razliq Rural District, in the Central District of Sarab County, East Azerbaijan Province, Iran. At the 2006 census, its population was 352, in 85 families.

References 

Populated places in Sarab County